Amphiongia is a genus of moths of the family Noctuidae.  The genus was erected by George Hampson in 1926.

Species
 Amphiongia achroa (Lower, 1903)
 Amphiongia chordophoides (Lucas, 1892)
 Amphiongia ochreomarginata (Joicey & Talbot, 1917)

References

Catocalinae
Noctuoidea genera